Sylvia Grace Borda is a Canadian artist working in photography, video and emergent technologies. Borda has worked as a curator, a lecturer, a multimedia framework architect with a specialization in content arrangement (GUI) and production. Born and raised in Vancouver, Borda is currently based in Vancouver, Helsinki, and Scotland. Her work has been exhibited locally, nationally, and internationally.

Artistic practice
Borda studied anthropology and fine art as an undergraduate at the University of British Columbia (1991–1996) and then a MFA in digital media at the same institution. She studied and graduated with a BFA in photography and video at the Emily Carr University of Art and Design (1993–95).

Borda achieved early recognition for her photographic practice. Her first exhibition was a national, juried photography exhibition entitled Photoperspectives '88, which ran during November 1988 at the Presentation House Gallery in West Vancouver. Elizabeth Godley praised Borda's work as "[leavening] an otherwise deadly serious exhibit with her cheerful view from Grandma's Window."

More recently, Borda has produced works as a part of Frontiers in Retreat that captures "intimate insights into Finland's agricultural resources and peoples". This is in line with her interests in "re-addressing public views about specific socio-cultural landscapes and how cultural symbols may be co-opted to form new media platforms", an interest which has generated an array of stereo-works and multi-dimensional tableaux produced in Google Streetview. The innovative Farm Tableaux won her the 2016 Lumen Prize, and was a product of the "first explorative artworks in Google Street View in partnership with Google Business StreetView photographer, John M Lynch".

Research and teaching
Borda has held teaching positions as Senior Photography Lecturer at University of Salford from January – September 2010, as MA Convenor in Photography and Imaging at Queen's University Belfast, and Associate Researcher in New Media at the University of British Columbia. From 2009–2016 Borda was an Honorary Research Fellow in Visual Arts at the University of Stirling, Scotland.

In her academic posts, Borda examined how "cognitive responses evolve over time in relation to a media stimuli" as part of her broader research interests in "examination of popular culture and in the emergence of convergent graphical user interface systems." At the same time, Borda conducted research on "accessibility standards, tools and the plausibility of their facilitation for projects supporting cultural collections". She has participated in research projects on PDA deployment and cultural/visual recognition, examined the Canadian Heritage Information Network's mobile technologies and new wireless (was) enabled catalogue, and was the architect behind EdWeb, an "educational on-line content generation tool, designed to meet England's National Curriculum needs for school children aged 8–13."

Curatorial work
 Scripted Exhibition - curated by Borda, 2004 
 Digital Visions - New media interviews 2004-05 - curated by Borda
 ESC - Electronic Social Culture, New Media artists in Canada - Curated by Borda, Gu Xiong, Sadira Rodrugues, Centre A, Vancouver, BC, 2002

Publications
 Borda, Sylvia Grace., & Strom, Jordan. (Eds.) (2020). Sylvia Grace Borda: Shifting Perspectives. Heritage House Press.
 Borda, Sylvia Grace (2018) "LOCATING THE CAMERA IN A DIGITAL TIME," photographies, 11:2-3, 177-192, DOI: 10.1080/17540763.2018.1445014 
Borda, Sylvia Grace (2006) EK modernism: celebrating Scotland's first New Town

Solo exhibitions
 Kissing Project, Oxygen Arts Centre, British Columbia, Canada (June 6 – July 8, 2017).
 Murals, Serde Arts Centre, Aizpute, Latvia (2017)
 The Lumsden Biscuit, Scottish Sculpture Workshop, Scotland (2016) Curated by Nuno Sacramento.
 Revisiting a Holiday in Glenrothes, The Lighthouse, Scotland's Centre for Architecture and Design. (March 28 – May 8, 2015) Produced by the Scottish Civic Trust.
 Camera Histories, Street Level Photoworks, Glasgow, Scotland. (November 22, 2013 – February 2, 2014) Curated by Malcolm Dickson.
 Aerial Fields, Surrey Urban Screen, British Columbia. (September 8, 2013 – January 6, 2014) Curated by Liane Davison and Alison Rajah.
 Beyond Sight: Interrogations of a Camera, A&D Gallery, London, UK. (2009–2010) Curated by Karen Downey
 Cameras and Watercolour sunsets, CSA Space, Vancouver, Canada. Curated by Christopher Brayshaw and Steven Tong.
 A Holiday in Glenrothes, Royal Institute of Architect's Scotland Gallery, Edinburgh, Scotland (2008).
 Traveling to Glenrothes, Rothes Hall Galleries, Fife, Scotland (2008) Curated by Andy Neil.
 EK Modernism, CSA Space, Vancouver, Canada. (2007) Curated by Adam Harrison.
 EK Modernism: New Town Passages, EKAC Galleries, East Kilbride, Scotland. (2006)
 New works, East Kilbride Arts Centre, Scotland (2005) Curated by J.Keith Donnelly.
 Minimalist Portraits, Net Art Launch, SAW Art Gallery, Ottawa, Ontario (2004) Curated by Jason St Laurent.
 Every Bus Stop in Surrey, BC, Surrey Art Gallery, Surrey, British Columbia. (2002) Curated by Liane Davison.
 Capital Cities, Centre A, Vancouver, British Columbia. (2002) Curated by Alice Ming Wai Jim.
 In Transit, Pocket Gallery, Vancouver, British Columbia (1999) Curated by Jeremy Turner.
 Of Myth and Muse, Richmond Art Gallery, Richmond, British Columbia, (1996) Curated by Paige Hope-Smith.

Group exhibitions
 Home/Shelter/Belonging: Sylvia Grace Borda, Jim Breukelman, Germaine Koh, Hani Al Moulia, Annie Pootoogook, Itee Pootoogook, Gu Xiong, Exhibition curated by Robin Laurence and Darrin Morrison, West Vancouver Museum: Art, Design + Architecture, BC (July 19 – September 9, 2017)
  Edge Effects II, Frontiers in Retreat (Lumsden Biscuit presentation), Centre for Contemporary Art, Glasgow, Scotland, Guest Curated by Yvonne Billmore, SSW (July 28–31, 2017)
 Sites of Assembly, the Morris and Helen Belkin Art Gallery, Vancouver, British Columbia. (June 23 – August 13, 2017)
 Napier University, Edinburgh, Scotland (2017)
 Glasgow Women's Library Group exhibition, Scotland (2017)
 Summer Exhibition, Mustarinda, Finland (June 16- August 8, 2017)
 Lumen Prize Digital Arts Tour 2017: Canary Wharf Winter Festival, London, England; FQ Projects, Shanghai, China; Leeds Digital Art Festival, UK; New York City's Creative Tech week, USA
 Lumen Prize, Digital Arts Tour 2016: Hackney House, London, England; Cardiff Technology Centre, United Kingdom; Berlin Electronic Visualisation Conference, Germany; Caerphilly Castle, Wales (2016)
 Man-Made Art, A+D Gallery, London, England (Jan 11 – February 22, 2016)
 Summer show, Photographs and prints. A&D Gallery, London, United Kingdom. Guest curated by Maika (July 16 – August 30, 2015)
 Mantta Summer Exhibition: a new present || uusi nykyisyys. (June 13 – August 31, 2015) Curated by Kalle Hamm & Dzamil Kamanger.
 A Sense of Place, Oulu Art Museum, Finland (January 23 – March 15, 2015) Curated by Helka Ketonen.
 Cultural Productions, SERDE Residency, Latvia (September 2015)
 Views from the Southbank: Information, Objects, Mapping, Surrey Art Gallery, British Columbia (September 19 – December 13, 2015) Curator: Jordan Strom.
 Residency: Frontiers in Retreat workshop, Helsinki International Artist Programme, Finland (2014). Curated by Jenni Nurmenniemi & Nuno Sacramento.
 Digital Cultures, Museum of Finnish Photography, Helsinki, Finland (2014)
 "Figuring Ground: Sylvia Grace Borda and Jeremy Herndl," Surrey Art Gallery, British Columbia (September 21 – December 15, 2013) Curated by Jordan Strom.
 NORTHERN IRELAND: 30 Years of Photography, Belfast Exposed Gallery and the MAC, (May 10 – July 7, 2013) Curated by Karen Downey, Catalog by Colin Graham.
 Blueprint, Street Level Photoworks, Glasgow, Scotland. (February 2 – March 31, 2013)
 Beyond Vague Terrain: The City and The Serial Image, Surrey Art Gallery, Canada. Curated by Jordan Strom (2012)
 Zoo Art Sculptural Biennale, Cueno, Italy (2012)
 Seeing and Being in the Landscape, Blue Wall Gallery, Ireland Curated by Joe Keenan (2011)
 Scoping Worlds, Leitrim Sculpture Centre, Ireland. (2010) Curated by Sean O'Reilly.
 Glocal, Cultural Capital of Canada Artist Project, Tech Lab, Surrey Art Gallery (2009–2010)
 '(Not) A Photograph' Exhibition Obalne Galerije, Piran, Slovenia. (2008) Curated by Vasja Nagy.
 re-COLLECT-ing, Naughton Gallery, Belfast, Northern Ireland (2008)
 Subversive Cartography, National web launch – Virtual Net Art,Gallery TPW, Toronto, Ontario. (2007) Curated by Michael Alstad and Daniel Young.
 Proun series, HZ Net Gallery. (2007) Curated by Sachiko Hayashi.
 Two Chicken Noodle, Barcode Series, Digital Fringe, Melbourne (2007)
 National web launch – Virtual Net Art, Gallery TPW, Toronto, Ontario. (2007) Curated by Michael Alstad and Daniel Young
 Node.London'06, Media Arts Festival and exhibition (2007)
 Pixelware, Travelling exhibition:  Dazibao Gallery, Montreal and Photographer's Gallery, Toronto (2005) Pixelware, a sublime forgery is a collaborative project curated by Dazibao, France Choinière and Marisa Portolese, and Gallery 44, Sara Angelucci and Elaine Whittaker.   
 Ruins and Civilization: Stan Douglas, Antonia Hirsch, Sylvia Grace Borda, International art exhibition, Eslite Vision Art Space, Taipei, Taiwan. (August 7–29, 2004) Curated by Amy Cheng.

Permanent Collections
 Morris and Helen Belkin Art Gallery, University of British Columbia, Vancouver, Canada 
 National Galleries Scotland
 St Andrews University, Scotland 
 Surrey Art Gallery 
 Ulster Museum, Belfast, Northern Ireland 
 Vancouver Art Gallery

Public Art
In 2011, Borda created Working River, a landscape photomural which was installed at Number 4 Pump Station on the corner of No.4 Road and Bridgeport street. This work was commissioned by the City of Richmond Public Art Program.  It was also part of a submission that won an Award of Excellence Project of the Year from BC Public Works Association.

Residencies
 Darts Hill Gardens, Canada, April - October 2021.
 Inaugural Artist in Residence, Public Art Program, Minoru Centre for Active Living, City of Richmond, BC, Canada May 2018 - May 2019.
 Kwantlen Polytechnic University, Surrey, BC, Canada January 6, 2018 - January 29, 2019.
 Mustarinda Art Centre, Finland, April 5 - May 1, 2016.
 Helsinki International Artists Program, March 28, 2016 – April 3, 2016.
 Scottish Sculpture Workshop, February 20 - March 15, 2016.
 Helsinki International Artists Program, January 1, 2014 – December 31, 2015.
 Peace III, Cavan Arts, County Cavan, Ireland, May 2009 - February 2011.
 Taipei Artist Village, Taiwan, August 5–30, 2004.

Public grants and awards
 Creative Climate Commission, British Council (2021)
 Frontiers in Retreat, EU Visual Arts and Innovation (2014–17) 
 Lumen Prize Web Based Award (2016)
 BC Innovation and Media Grant (2011–12) 
 Creative Communities Grant, Province of British Columbia, Canada.
 Surrey Art Gallery Urban Screen Production Grant.
 City of Richmond Public Art Commission: No.4 Pump Station (2010–11).
 Cultural Capital of Canada Artist status award in combination with Cultural Olympiad project status for the Vancouver Winter Olympics (2008–10)
 the Innovation Award, The Lighthouse Gallery Glasgow (2006)
 the Urban Culture Award (through the Millennium Commission, Cities of Culture Liverpool) for 2005–07.

Further listening
 "Street Level Photoworks, Close-up: Sylvia Grace Borda in conversation with Christiane Monarchi," March 5, 2021. Glasgow, Scotland, 2021.
 "Recasting Modernism - Scotland and Venice Architecture Biennale Roundtable," Glasgow, Scotland, March 17, 2015.
 "Sylvia Grace Borda talking about the development of the 'Kissing Project'," with Kootenay Co-op Radio, Nelson, BC, 2017.
 "Sylvia Grace Borda talking about the creation of Farm Tableaux in Canada and Finland," Helsinki, Finland, 2015.
 "Recasting Modernism - Scotland and Venice Architecture Biennale Roundtable," Glasgow, Scotland, March 17, 2015.
 "Sylvia Grace Borda talking about the photography activity ' Take a Holiday In Your Own Back Yard'," 2014, with the Scottish Civic Trust.
 "Q+A between Christiane Monarchi of PhotoMonitor Magazine and Sylvia Grace Borda," November 24, 2013 at Street Level Photoworks, Glasgow, Scotland.
 "Agency of Light: A history of the photogram - an artist discussion," April 5, 2013 at Street Level Photoworks, Glasgow, Scotland.
 "Seeing across boundaries and borders - artist discussion about her residency work in Ireland," May 2010, with CavanArts.

References

Living people
Year of birth missing (living people)
21st-century Canadian artists
Canadian women artists
Canadian video artists
Women video artists
Canadian photographers
Scottish artists
Canadian women photographers
Scottish women photographers
Digital artists
Women digital artists
Artists from Vancouver
University of British Columbia alumni
Emily Carr University of Art and Design alumni